The 1958 Tourist Trophy may refer to the following races:
 The 1958 Isle of Man TT, for Grand Prix Motorcycles
 The 1958 RAC Tourist Trophy, for sports cars held at Goodwood
 The 1958 Australian Tourist Trophy, for sports cars held at Mount Panorama
 The 1958 Victorian Tourist Trophy, for sports cars held at Albert Park
 The 1958 Dutch TT, for Grand Prix Motorcycles held at Assen